Maricarmen Valls Esponda (born 7 October 1980) is a Mexican politician from the National Action Party. From 2010 to 2012 she served as Deputy of the LXI Legislature of the Mexican Congress representing Chiapas.

References

1980 births
Living people
Politicians from Mexico City
Women members of the Chamber of Deputies (Mexico)
National Action Party (Mexico) politicians
21st-century Mexican politicians
21st-century Mexican women politicians
Deputies of the LXI Legislature of Mexico
Members of the Chamber of Deputies (Mexico) for Chiapas